Frank J. Schlueter (1874 - 1972) was a documentary and commercial photographer in Southeast Texas.

Career
Schlueter photographed the quickly growing Houston region in the first half of the twentieth century, retiring in 1964. Schlueter's work was used by early oil producers in the region to document and promote their work.

References

External links
 Images by Frank J. Schlueter at the Rice Digital Scholarship Archives "Museum of Houston"
 Images by Frank J. Schlueter at the Library of Congress

1870s births
1972 deaths
American photographers
Commercial photographers
Documentary photographers